Club Deportivo Huelva Baloncesto is a basketball team based in Huelva, Andalusia, Spain.

History
Huelva Baloncesto was founded in 2008 with the aim to replace the former Liga ACB team in the city, CB Ciudad de Huelva, which was dissolved due to its enormous debts.

In its first season, the club joined the fourth tier, LEB Bronce, thanks to an invitation of the Spanish Basketball Federation and finished promoting to LEB Plata. In 2010, due to a lack of sponsorship, Huelva Baloncesto resigned to continue playing in professional leagues.

Season by season

References

External links
Official website

Basketball teams in Andalusia
Basketball teams established in 2008
Former LEB Plata teams
Sport in Huelva